Aryna Sabalenka was the defending champion, and successfully defended her title, defeating Alison Riske in the final 6–3, 3–6, 6–1.

Ashleigh Barty retained the WTA No. 1 singles ranking at the end of the tournament. Karolína Plíšková was also in contention for the top ranking at the start of the tournament.

Seeds
The top eight seeds received a bye into the second round.

Draw

Finals

Top half

Section 1

Section 2

Bottom half

Section 3

Section 4

Qualifying

Seeds

Qualifiers

Lucky losers

Draw

First qualifier

Second qualifier

Third qualifier

Fourth qualifier

Fifth qualifier

Sixth qualifier

Seventh qualifier

Eighth qualifier

References

External links
 Main draw
 Qualifying draw

Singles